Amin Maktab, established in 1961, is a special education center for mentally disabled children located in Gulberg, Lahore, Punjab, Pakistan. Amin Maktab is the oldest institution in Lahore for intellectually disabled children.

History
Amin Maktab School was established in small rented building in October 1961 by the Pakistan Society for the Welfare of Retarded Children. In 1987, a multi-purpose campus in J-block of Gulberg was designed by the local Architect Fuad Ali Butt and was built by Engineer Khalid Khan, a local builder.

In 1991, an outreach programme was started, with the aid from UNICEF, for the purpose of  spreading awareness as well as providing services and training to the homes of mentally disabled children in economically depressed areas of Lahore. Currently, the management of Amin Maktab is handled by now retired Justice Aamer Raza Khan.

See also
 List of special education institutions in Lahore

References

External links 

 Video showing history of Amin Maktab on YouTube

Special schools in Pakistan
Schools in Lahore